Jorge "Alex" Guillen-Torres (born June 28, 1994) is an American soccer player.

Career

College & Amateur
Guillen-Torres played for years of college soccer at Notre Dame de Namur University between 2012 and 2015.

During and after his time at college, Guillen-Torres played with USL PDL side Burlingame Dragons FC, Chula Vista FC during their Lamar Hunt US Open Cup run, and later with NPSL side ASC San Diego in 2017.

Professional
In January 2018, Guillen-Torres signed with USL side Las Vegas Lights FC ahead of their inaugural 2018 season. He was released by Las Vegas on May 21, 2018.

References

External links 
 

1994 births
Living people
American soccer players
Burlingame Dragons FC players
Las Vegas Lights FC players
Association football defenders
Soccer players from California
USL League Two players
USL Championship players
Notre Dame de Namur University alumni